Agustin Pérez (died 1286) was a Roman Catholic prelate who served as Bishop of Osma (1261–1286).

Biography
On 18 Oct 1261, Agustin Pérez was appointed during the papacy of Pope Urban IV as Bishop of Osma.
On 2 Mar 1262, he was consecrated bishop by Ramon Losaza, Archbishop of Seville, with Martin, Bishop of Segovia, and Martin Álvarez, Bishop of Segorbe-Albarracin, serving as co-consecrators. 
He served as Bishop of Osma until his death on 12 Apr 1286.

While bishop, he was the principal consecrator of Alfonso Garcia, Bishop of Palencia (1265) .

References

External links and additional sources
 (for Chronology of Bishops) 
 (for Chronology of Bishops) 

13th-century Roman Catholic bishops in Castile
Bishops appointed by Pope Urban IV
1286 deaths